Margaret T. May is Professor of Medical Statistics at the University of Bristol, and specialises in prognostic modelling and HIV epidemiology.

May has a master's degree from the University of Cambridge, and a master's degree and PhD from the University of Bristol.

Selected publications
May, M, Gompels, M & Sabin, C, 2010, ‘Impact on life expectancy of late diagnosis and treatment of HIV-1 infected individuals: UK CHIC’. in: Tenth International Congress on Drug Therapy in HIV Infection Glasgow, UK.
May, M, Boulle, A, Phiri, S, Messou, E, Myer, L, Wood, R, Keiser, O, Sterne, J, Dabis, F & Egger, M, 2010, ‘Prognosis of patients with HIV-1 infection starting antiretroviral therapy in sub-Saharan Africa: a collaborative analysis of scale-up programmes’. The Lancet, vol 376., pp. 449 – 457
Ingle, S, Fairall, L, Timmerman, V, Bachmann, M, Sterne, JAC, Egger, M, May, M & Southern, AI-, 2010, ‘Competing Risks Analysis of Pre-Treatment Mortality and Probability of Starting ART in Patients Enrolled in the Free State ARV Program, South Africa’. in: Abstract 7, 14th International Workshop on HIV, Sitges, Spain., pp. 5 – 6
May, M, Emond, A & Crawley, E, 2010, ‘Phenotypes of Chronic Fatigue Syndrome in Children and Young People’. Archives of Disease in Childhood, vol 95., pp. 245 – 249
Sterne, J, May, M, Costagliola, D, Wolf, Fd, Phillips, A, Harris, R, Funk, M, Geskus, R, Gill, J, Dabis, F, Miro, J, Justice, A, Ledergerber, B, Fatkenheuer, G, Hogg, R, Monforte, Ad, Saag, M, Smith, C, Staszewski, S, Egger, M, Cole, S & , 2009, ‘Timing of initiation of antiretroviral therapy in AIDS-free HIV-1-infected patients: a collaborative analysis of 18 HIV cohort studies’. The Lancet, vol 373., pp. 1352 – 1363
Taffe, P & May, M, 2008, ‘A joint back calculation model for the imputation of the date of HIV infection in a prevalent cohort’. Stat Med, vol 27 (23)., pp. 4835 – 4853
Ebrahim, S, May, M, McCarron, P, Frankel, S, Smith, GD & Yarnell, J, 2001, ‘Sexual intercourse and risk of ischaemic stroke and coronary heart disease: the Caerphilly study’. in: Societies, Individuals and Populations - Joint conference of the Society for Social Medicine and the International Epidemiological Association European Group, Oxford.
Bleiber, G, May, M, Martinez, R, Meylan, P, Ott, J, Beckmann, J, Telenti, A & Cohort, StSH, 2005, ‘Use of a combined ex vivo/in vivo population approach for screening of human genes involved in the human immunodeficiency virus type 1 life cycle for variants influencing disease progression’. Journal of Virology, vol 79 (20)., pp. 12674 – 12680
Gill, J, May, M, Lewden, C, Saag, M, Mugavero, M, Reiss, P, Ledergerber, B, Mocroft, A, Harris, R, Fux, C, Justice, A, Costagliola, D, Casabona, J, Hogg, R, Khaykin, P, Lampe, F, Vehreschild, J & Sterne, J, 2010, ‘Causes of death in HIV-1 infected patients treated with antiretroviral therapy 1996-2006: collaborative analysis of 13 HIV cohort studies’. Clinical Infectious Diseases, vol 50., pp. 1387 – 1396

References

Academics of the University of Bristol
Alumni of the University of Bristol
Alumni of the University of Cambridge
Living people
Year of birth missing (living people)